CITIC Tower (otherwise known as China Zun) is a supertall skyscraper in the Central Business District of Beijing, China. On 18 August 2016, CITIC Tower surpassed China World Trade Center Tower III in height, becoming Beijing's tallest building. The tower structurally topped out on 9 July 2017, fully topped out on 18 August 2017, and was completed in late 2018, making CITIC Tower the tallest completed building of 2018.

The nickname China Zun comes from the zun, an ancient Chinese wine vessel which inspired the building design, according to the developers, the CITIC Group. The groundbreaking ceremony of the building took place in Beijing on 19 September 2011, and the constructors expected to finish the project within five years. CITIC Tower is Northern China's third-tallest building after Goldin Finance 117 and Chow Tai Fook Binhai Center in Tianjin.

Farrells produced the tower's land bid concept design, with Kohn Pedersen Fox assuming the project and completing a 14-month-long concept design process after the client had won the bid.

China Zun is a mixed-use building, featuring 60 floors of office space, 20 floors of luxury apartments and 20 floors of hotel with 300 rooms.

Controversy
In April 2018, Hong Kong newspaper Ming Pao reported that China Zun's top three floors, Levels 106–107 and an observatory on level 108, was to be expropriated by the national-security apparatus, since the entire Zhongnanhai complex, the headquarters of the Central Committee of the Communist Party of China and the State Council of the People's Republic of China, could be seen from the top of the skyscraper with the naked eye on a clear day. It is also said that with high-end telescopes and other monitoring equipment, the day-to-day lives and activities of the Party and State Leaders could be seen. The building was ordered to be rectified for "fire safety issues" by the authorities, but the CITIC Group was unable to reveal the specific reason for rectification. It is also said the top three floors of the building will be administered by the National Security authorities after rectification.

Gallery

Function Division

The building has a total of seven office areas. Among them, Areas 1–3, Area 5 and Area 7 are occupied by China CITIC Bank, Alibaba and CITIC Group respectively, becoming the main tenants of China Zun; the remaining office areas are leased to Fortune Global 500 Enterprises and financial institutions, including China Construction Bank.

See also 
List of buildings with 100 floors or more
List of tallest buildings in Beijing

References 

Skyscraper office buildings in Beijing
Buildings and structures in Chaoyang District, Beijing
Residential skyscrapers in China
Skyscraper hotels in Beijing
2018 establishments in China
Office buildings completed in 2018
Residential buildings completed in 2018
Hotel buildings completed in 2018